Radim Běleš is a Paralympic athlete from the Czech Republic competing mainly in category F51 club throwing and discus events.

Běleš competed in the 2000 Summer Paralympics in the club throwing event, without winning a medal, he did however win a silver medal in that event in the 2004 Summer Paralympics where he also won the F32/51 discus. He competed at both the 2008 Summer Paralympics in Beijing and the 2012 Summer Paralympics in London, taking silver in the club throw at the latter.

References

External links
  
 

Paralympic athletes of the Czech Republic
Athletes (track and field) at the 2000 Summer Paralympics
Athletes (track and field) at the 2004 Summer Paralympics
Athletes (track and field) at the 2008 Summer Paralympics
Paralympic gold medalists for the Czech Republic
Paralympic silver medalists for the Czech Republic
Czech club throwers
Czech male discus throwers
Living people
Medalists at the 2004 Summer Paralympics
Medalists at the 2012 Summer Paralympics
Athletes (track and field) at the 2012 Summer Paralympics
Year of birth missing (living people)
Paralympic medalists in athletics (track and field)
Wheelchair discus throwers
Paralympic discus throwers
Paralympic club throwers